Tico Records was a New York City record label that was founded in 1948. It was originally owned by George Goldner and later acquired by Morris Levy and incorporated into Roulette Records. It specialized in Latin music and was significant for introducing artists such as Ray Barretto and Tito Puente. In 1974, it was sold to Fania Records and stopped issuing new releases in 1981; however, the label's extensive catalog continues to be reissued under the Tico Records name.

See also
List of record labels

External links
Tico Records at Discogs.com
"Tito Puente: The Complete 78s (1949-1955)" by Ted Gioia (Jazz.com)
Tico Records on the Internet Archive's Great 78 Project

 
American record labels
Record labels established in 1948
Record labels disestablished in 1981
Latin American music record labels